The Davis' Mills Battle Site is the historic site of an American Civil War conflict that took place on December 21, 1862. It was added to the National Register of Historic Places on October 2, 1973. It is located off Mississippi Hwy 7 in what is now Michigan City, Mississippi in Benton County, Mississippi.

The cavalry of the Confederate Army under Major General Earl Van Dorn attacked a Federal garrison at the Davis' Mills the site on December 21, 1862. The small settlement included houses, a flour mill, and a saw mill on the north bank of the Wolf River near a Mississippi Central Railroad wooden trestle crossing. An Indian mound was used by Federal troops as a fortification. A tree on the site was carved with names, dates, initials, and regimental information by some of the soldiers.

See also
National Register of Historic Places listings in Mississippi

References

Benton County, Mississippi
American Civil War sites
1862 in American politics
American Civil War on the National Register of Historic Places
Conflict sites on the National Register of Historic Places in Mississippi
Mississippi in the American Civil War
National Register of Historic Places in Benton County, Mississippi